Chilsag Chillies is an Indian theatre company and the flagship LiveShow, Stageplay and musical production arm of the Chilsag Entertainment Network. The company has operations in US, UK, Canada and India and has a network of talented artists all over the world. Chilsag Chillies also maintains a global network of research centers in key cities around the world that provide inputs on the latest in world theatre. Founded in 2003 by Sachin Gupta, Chilsag Chillies Theatre Company prides itself in being one of the few theatre companies that showcase their own original creations. Within the short period of its existence, Chilsag Chillies Theatre Company has been able to set a benchmark of success in the field of theatre. The very first production of the company, “Celebration of Life”, was felicitated by the chief minister of Delhi, Sheila Dikshit and was also appreciated internationally when it was performed at the Factory Theatre, Toronto, Canada and Off-Broadway Theare, New York. The high standard set by the first production has only been matched, if not surpassed, by the succeeding productions.

Chilsag's Theatre Laboratory is passionately involved in gathering information on theatre from all over the world to preserve the theatre heritage. The theatre company now has more than 700 actors from more than 20 countries all across the world.

History

2003-2010 
Founded in 2003 by Sachin Gupta, Chilsag Chillies Theatre Company was founded with the objective to redefine theatre through its innovative theatre productions. The very first production of the company, “Celebration of Life”, was felicitated by the chief minister of Delhi, Sheila Dikshit and was also appreciated internationally when it was performed at the Factory Theatre, Toronto, Canada and Off-Broadway Theare, New York. Chilsag tied up with Actor's experimental Lab USA and established an acting school 'Salgane School of Acting' as well in 2003. In 2004, Chilsag Chillies received letters of appreciation from Dr. APJ Abdul Kalam (former President of India), Shivraj Patil (former Home Minister, India) and the Italian cultural centre and Department of Art and Culture, Government of India for the contribution to theatre. Late 2004, Chilsag laid the foundation of a new venture operationalising Corporate Theatre across its units. Theatre Pasta, an international theatre magazine was launched in 2005. Chilsag also stages two of its productions in locations across London in three days with its pack of English actors. Mid 2006, witnessed the initiation of Chilsag Children's Theatre Company and Theatre-in-Education projects. Chilsag Theatre Pasta International Awards successfully started its journey in beginning of 2007. The company staged the premier of its plays, 'A Rollercoaster Ride', 'Wake Up Call' and 'Kailashnath Weds Madhumati' at one of the premier performing arts location in the capital city, New Delhi. Chilsag took its theatre production 'Celebration of Life', 'Handicapped City' to the international forum through shows Off-Broadway (New York City), Factory Theatre (Canada), locations across Boston, West Virginia and other cities. This year marked the launch of International Repertory for Chilsag with American actors. in 2009, Chilsag started its own Drama Therapy Centre. Late 2010, witnessed a collaboration with Indian Council for Cultural Relations and staged the play ' Wake Up Call'.

2011-2019 
In 2011, Director Sachin Gupta received the Natya Bhushan, the highest ranking award for his contribution to Hindi theatre. 2015 also witnessed the conceptualisation and production of the biggest musical to be staged the capital city named, 'Chota Bheem The Musical' witnessed by over 18000 in the Siri Fort Auditorium. Recent tie up with London Players, UK for theatre and cinematic ventures. A new production ' Kafan' was also staged in 2017 with collaboration with the Indo -American Friendship Association and supported by the Ministry of Culture (India). The short film 'Pihu'  which is based on the theatre production "Don't Miss My Party" was also released. Chilsag's Alumni includes film and television actors Huma Qureshi, Jitin Gulati, Deepak Wadhwa, Vasundhara Das, Gauri Karnik, Anjum Farooki, Nausheen Ali Sardar, Anuj Saxena, Prerna Wanvari, Kashmira Irani, Shraddha Musale, Rubina Dilaik and Neha Pawar.

Vision & values 
Chilsag Chillies is an ensemble of nine qualities that run through as a common thread in all the activities of the company. 
 C - Creative
 H - Humor
 I - Innovation
 L - Learning
 S - Sincerity, successful
 A - Ambition to excel
 G - Gagner, a winning attitude

The company has a strong vision that aims at developing leaders in the field of entertainment and performing arts and to entertain, educate, and inspire the people by producing challenging, progressive and contemporary work. They also strongly believe to create an environment that appreciates and encourages theatre and cinema and helps foster the spirit of creativity.

Notable Performances

Theatre productions

Past Seasons 
2007-2008
 At the Sriram Centre Auditorium: Wake Up Call, A Roller Coaster Ride,

2006-2007
 At the Sriram Centre Auditorium: Kailashnath Weds Madhumati

2005-2006
 At the LTG Auditorium: Suicide is Painless, Devil's Carnival, No Cheating Today, Live Telecast, Great Mind At Work', Don't Miss My Party, Next Indian Idol

2004-2005
 At the Sirifort Auditorium: Handicapped City

2003-2004
 At the Sriram Centre Auditorium: Celebration Of Life

References

External links

The Telegraph 'Individuals shine at theatre festival'
The Times of India 'A Dramatic Idea'
The Indian Express, 'Stage Dreams'
The Hindu, 'An Alarm to Action'
DNA,' I'm Foot in Mouth'
MIDDAY, 'A look from Inside Out'

The Tribune, 'Out Of the Box'
The Indian Express, 'Sachin Gupta makes the stage come alive'
The Hindu, 'Life On Stage'
The Tribune, ‘Celebration of Life’ a moving play
The Pioneer, ‘Choose the right Path'

The Statesman, ‘Play Review’
The Times of India, ‘Chilsag Theatre festival’
The Pioneer, ‘Trying to give theatre some shelf Life
Playbill.com, Handicapped City to play Soho Playhouse
Deccan Herald,'Taking a break to chase dreams'

External links

Theatre companies in India